Henri-Pierre Danloux (24 February 1753 – 3 January 1809) was a French painter and draftsman.

He was born in Paris. Brought up by his architect uncle, Danloux was a pupil of Lépicié and later of Vien, whom he followed to Rome in 1775. In 1783, he returned to Lyon and Paris, where he was patroned by the Baronne Mégret de Sérilly d'Etigny, who secured for him a number of important portrait commissions exclusively for the aristocracy. He emigrated to London in 1792 thereby escaping the French Revolution and its potential consequences.

While in England, he was commissioned for portraits of the officer class and the well-to-do. Members of one such family, the Lamberts of Oxfordshire, engaged the master in 1800 and had sittings for its individual members: father, mother and son (Henry John Lambert, Bt.), himself, later in life, serving in the Grenadier Regiment of Foot Guards, a Deputy Lieutenant for Oxfordshire and High Sheriff [Peter Lambert from a letter - Pawsey & Payne, 1973]. Danloux, returned to Paris in 1801, there resuming his career.

Danloux was influenced by fashionable English portrait painters such as Thomas Lawrence (1769–1830), John Hoppner (1758–1810), and George Romney (1734–1802). In 1793, he exhibited at the Royal Academy in London which resulted in commissions from a number of British patrons.
Danloux died in Paris in 1809.

See also
 The Skating Minister

References

Pawsey & Payne, Fine Art Dealers: Valuations and Restoration, 1 Bury Street,
St. James's, London S.W. Letter of Valuation dated April 12, 1973
(The portrait of the son, Sir Henry John Lambert Bt., "...is illustrated and recorded  in Baron Roget's book on Danloux and family records refer to the sittings.")

 Olivier Meslay,« Henry-Pierre Danloux (1753-1809), sa carrière avant l’exil en Angleterre », Bulletin de la Société d’Histoire de l’Art Français, Paris, 2007 (année 2006), p. 209-244.
 Olivier Meslay, « L’enrichissement d’un fonds ancien de la collection Jacques Doucet : les archives Portalis et Danloux », Les Nouvelles de l’INHA, Décembre 2009, p. 18-21.
Olivier Meslay, "La famille d’Etigny et le peintre Henri-Pierre Danloux", Bulletin de la Société archéologique du Gers, 2004/4, p. 459-465.
 Olivier Meslay “Le Sublime social ou la Pitié mise en pièce” in Mehdi Korchane, Figure de l’exil de Bléisaire à Marcus Sextus, Musée de la Révolution Française, 2016, p. 80 à 91.
Olivier Meslay “Beauté d’un ordre renversé : Danloux et l’image de l’émigration” in Mehdi Korchane, Figure de l’exil de Bléisaire à Marcus Sextus, Musée de la Révolution Française, 2016, p. 80 à 91.

External links
  Henri-Pierre Danloux on the Joconde database

1753 births
1809 deaths
18th-century French painters
French male painters
19th-century French painters
French draughtsmen
19th-century French male artists
18th-century French male artists